Iecavas Ziņas is a regional newspaper published in Latvia.

Iecava
Newspapers published in Latvia